Virat Vachirarattanawong (born: November 25, 1947 in Bangkok) is a Thai Muay Thai and professional boxing promoter. He is the founder and chairman of Petchyindee Boxing Promotions aka Diamond Boxing Promotions, a Muay Thai and professional boxing promotion company based in Bangkok. He has a nickname "Sia Nao" (เสี่ยเน้า).

Biography
Virat was born in Thai Chinese wealthy family in Bangkok, his family has a diamond and gold business. His family's jewelry shops are located at Banglampoo and Phahurat. He entered the fighting circuit in his early twenties with visits to the Muay Thai matches at the Rajadamnern Stadium and Lumpinee Stadium on a regular basis.

In 1975, he set up a Muay Thai gym called "Petchyindee". There were many fighters competing under his stable, many are champions like Ruengsak Petchyindee, Sagatthong Petchyindee, Sirimongkol Luksiripat, Sagat Petchyindee, Yodsanklai Fairtex, Sam-A Kaiyanghadaogym, Phetmorakot Wor Sangprapai etc.

In 1982, he was promoted to regular promoter of the Lumpinee Stadium. He held a Muay Thai match at this stadium titled "Suek Petchyindee" (ศึกเพชรยินดี; lit: "Diamond Pleased Battle").

In 1992, he turned to professional boxing by successfully launching several boxers such as, Chatchai Sasakul, Samson Dutch Boy Gym, Nungdiaw Sakcharuporn, Medgoen Singsurat, Pongsaklek Wonjongkam, Oleydong Sithsamerchai, Kompayak Porpramook, Yodmongkol Vor Saengthep, Wanheng Menayothin, Knockout CP Freshmart and Saen Sor Ploenchit. There are many who are under his stable such as Palangpol CP Freshmart, Petch CP Freshmart, Yodgoen Tor Chalermchai.

, he was still a promoter, with his eldest son, Nattadej "Boat" Wachirarattanawong, and his cousin, Piyarat "Tung" Wachirarattanawong as major assistants.

References

External links

Virat Vachirarattanawong
Virat Vachirarattanawong
Virat Vachirarattanawong
Virat Vachirarattanawong
Virat Vachirarattanawong
Boxing managers
1947 births
Living people